State Route 137 (SR 137) is a  southwest-to-northeast state highway in the west-central part of the U.S. state of Georgia. The highway connects Cusseta with Buena Vista and Butler. It travels through the southeastern portion of Fort Benning. Its routing exists within portions of Chattahoochee, Marion, and Taylor counties.

Route description
SR 137 begins in Cusseta, within Chattahoochee County, at an intersection with Wells Street, which used to also bear the designation of SR 520 Business. Just northeast of Cusseta, it has a very brief concurrency with SR 26. It continues to the northeast and cuts across the southeastern corner of Fort Benning and begins a concurrency with SR 355, just before leaving the fort. When the highway leaves the fort, it enters Marion County. It passes SR 137 Spur. Just northwest of Buena Vista is an intersection with SR 41. The two routes head southeast into town and split, with SR 41 heading south and SR 137 heading east and then northeast. SR 137 travels through rural areas of the county and has a very brief concurrency with SR 240 in Tazewell. In the northeast, it enters Taylor County and crosses just northwest of the Taylor–Schley county line. Less than  later is SR 90/SR 127. The three highways have a brief concurrency to the north, until SR 137 splits off to the northeast. Just southwest of Butler is SR 96/SR 540. In town, it meets US 19/SR 3. SR 137 continues to the northeast until it reaches its eastern terminus, an intersection with SR 128, just south of the Flint River.

SR 137 is not part of the National Highway System, a system of roadways important to the nation's economy, defense, and mobility.

Major intersections

Marion County spur route

State Route 137 Spur (SR 137 Spur) is a  spur route that exists entirely within the southwestern part of Marion County.

It begins at an intersection with the SR 137 mainline and heads northwest until it meets its northern terminus, an intersection with SR 355 mainline, southeast of Fort Benning.

SR 137 Spur is not part of the National Highway System, a system of roadways important to the nation's economy, defense, and mobility.

The roadway that would eventually become SR 137 Spur was established in April 1932 as an unnumbered road from Columbus to Buena Vista. Later that year, SR 103 was designated on this road. In 1937, the current path of SR 137 Spur had a "completed hard surface". Between June 1960 and June 1963, SR 103 was truncated west of Fort Benning. Part of its former path through Marion County was redesignated as SR 137 Spur.

See also

References

External links

 Georgia Roads (Routes 121 - 140)

137
Transportation in Chattahoochee County, Georgia
Transportation in Marion County, Georgia
Transportation in Taylor County, Georgia